The 2019 Zamfara State gubernatorial election occurred on March 9, 2019. APC's Mukhtar Shehu Idris polled 67.41% of the total popular votes, defeating PDP's Bello Matawalle who got 23.89% of the total votes and trailed behind by a margin of 345,089 votes, and several minor party candidates. APC swept the entire 14 LGAs of the state, winning in all. It was, however, Matawalle, who was later declared winner by the INEC and sworn in as governor after the verdict of the Supreme Court, which declared Idris' votes as 'wasted'.

Idris was announced winner at the gubernatorial primary, to avoid reaching INEC's deadline after a parallel election was organised by the out-going governor.

Bello Matawalle emerged winner in the PDP gubernatorial primary election. His running mate was Mahdi Mohammed Gusau.

Of the 42 candidates who aspired for the governorship seat, 40 were male, two were female.

Electoral system
The Governor of Zamfara State is elected using the plurality voting system.

Primary election

PDP primary
The PDP primary election was held from Sunday, September 30, until the early morning hours of Monday, October 1, 2018. About 1,500 accredited delegates were present from the - LGAs of the state. Bello Matawalle emerged winner with 1,426 (98.25%) delegate votes after his only opponent, Sahabi Ya'u, was 'made to step down' for him.

Candidates
Party nominee: Bello Mohammed Matawalle: Winner.
Running mate: Mahdi Bello Gusau.
 Sahabi Ya'u (Stepped down)

APC primary
The APC primary elections in Zamfara State could not be held before the deadline set by the INEC, leading the disqualification of all APC candidates. The election was earlier scheduled for Sunday, September 30, but postponed to Monday, October 1, 2018. The rescheduled election was finally held on Wednesday, October 3, 2018, but then cancelled by the party's National Working Committee (NWC) due to the violence that marred the process. The party, however, announced Mukhtar Shehu Idris as winner of the parallel election organized by the incumbent governor, Abdul'aziz Abubakar Yari, on Sunday, October 7, 2018, in which Idris was said to have polled 310,380 votes, closely followed by Senator Kabiru Marafa with 54,607 votes. Other were Alh. Mahmuda Aliyu Shinkafi with 5,514 votes, Alh. Ibrahim Wakkala Muhammad 517 votes, Alh. Sagir Hamidu Gusau 102 votes, Alh. Aminu Sani Jaji 12,039 votes, Alh. Abu Magaji 340 votes, Alh. Dauda Lawal Dare 5,396 votes and Brig. Gen. Mansur Dan Ali (rtd.) with 292 votes, as announced by the state party chairman, Alh. Lawali M. Liman. This was to meet the Sunday, October 7, 2018, INEC deadline for all political parties to conclude their primary elections. Nevertheless, even with this result, the INEC insisted the party had no candidate in the state, and barred the party from fielding candidates in the upcoming election in the state. The party thereafter sought using judicial alternative to legalize its candidate at a law court, after which INEC agreed for the party to field candidates for the elections.

Candidates
Party nominee: Mukhtar Shehu Idris.
Running mate: .
 Kabiru Marafa: 54,607 votes.
 Aminu Sani Jaji: 12,039 votes.
 Mahmuda Aliyu Shinkafi: 5,514 votes.
 Dauda Lawal Dare: 5,396 votes.
 Ibrahim Wakkala Muhammad: 517 votes.
 Abu Magaji: 340 votes.
 Mansur Dan Ali: 292 votes.
 Sagir Hamidu Gusau: 102 votes.

Results
A total of 42 candidates registered with the Independent National Electoral Commission to contest in the election. APC candidate, Idris Shehu, won election by polling 534,541 votes, defeating APC's Bello Matawalle who came second with 189,452 votes. However, internal party crisis threatened APC's chance to continue governing the state.

The total number of registered voters in the state was 1,717,128 while 823,294 voters were accredited. Total number of votes cast was 810,782, while total number of valid votes was 792,938. Total rejected votes were 17,844.

By local government area
Here are the results of the election from the local government areas of the state for the two major parties. The total valid votes of 792,913 represents the 42 political parties that participated in the election. Green represents LGAs won by Matawalle. Blue represents LGAs won by Idris.

References 

Zamfara State gubernatorial election
Zamfara State gubernatorial election
Zamfara State gubernatorial elections
2019 Zamfara State elections